William Oandasan (1947–1992) was an American poet, journalist, editor, and publisher.  He was born on the Round Valley Reservation in Northern California, to Yuki tribe and Filipino parents.

Life
He founded the A Press in 1976 and edited A: A Journal of Contemporary Literature, one of the first literary magazines devoted to American Indian writers.

Awards
 1985 American Book Award for Round Valley Songs.

Works
 Taking Off (1976);
 Earth & Sky, A Press (1976);
 Sermon & Three Waves: A Journey Through Night (1978);
 A Branch of California Redwood (1980);
 Moving Inland, A Publications (1983);
 ;
 Round Valley Verses, Blue Cloud Quarterly (1987);
 Summer Night, A Publications (1989).

Anthologies

References

External links
"William Oandasan", NativeWiki
"INTERVIEW WITH WILLIAM OANDASAN.", Profile, 2/12/85

1947 births
1992 deaths
20th-century American poets
American Book Award winners